Chen Geng (27 February 1903 - 16 March 1961) was a Chinese military officer who served as a senior general in the People's Liberation Army. Enlisting in a warlord's army at the age of 13, Chen Geng joined the Chinese Communist Party in 1922 and was accepted into Whampoa Military Academy in 1924. He approached Chiang Kai-shek and even saved his life by preventing him from committing suicide. He served as a Communist spy in the National Revolutionary Army for 6 years. After being discovered, he joined the Communist base in Jiangxi and participated in the Long March. He fought the Imperial Japanese Army during the Second Sino-Japanese War and then the Nationalists during the Chinese Civil War. Once victory was obtained, he went to Vietnam to help Hồ Chí Minh against the French during the First Indochina War and then participated in the Korean War with the People's Volunteer Army. He became a senior general in 1955. He then founded an academy of military technologies but died before finalizing the ballistic missile and nuclear weapons programs.

Biography
Born in Xiangxiang, Hunan, Chen Geng is the second child in a sibling group of 12. His grandfather Chen Yihuai was an officer in the Xiang Army led by Zeng Guofan, a statesman, military general, and Confucian scholar of the late Qing dynasty (1644–1911). After his retirement, Chen Yihuai bought agricultural land with the reward, and by the time Chen Geng was born, his family owned several hundred mu and became one of the wealthiest in the region. Chen's father named Chen Daoliang and his mother named Peng Xuexian. But as his only older brother dies young from illness, Chen becomes the eldest son of the family. At 13, his father arranged a marriage with a daughter two years older, but Cheng refused the marriage and left his family to join the warlord's army. It is a disillusioned Chen who left the army at 18 and found a job at the Hunan Railway Bureau as a receptionist. During this period, he met Mao Zedong.

Chen joined the Chinese Communist Party in 1922 and studied at Whampoa Military Academy in 1924. Chen gained the confidence of Chiang Kai-shek and became commander of his garrison. In October 1925, during the second campaign against the local warlord Chen Jiongming, Chiang suffered a stunning defeat, Chiang was covered with shame but refused to flee, trying to kill himself. Cheng Geng managed to take his pistol and piggy backed him for around 10km out of danger. He thus gained Chiang's confidence; however, when the Kuomintang broke ties with the Communists in 1927, Chen went underground as a Communist agent in Shanghai.

In March 1933, Chen was sent to Shanghai to treat his leg wounds, but Chen was captured in Shanghai by the Kuomintang. But since he once saved Chiang Kai-shek's life, his life was spared. Chiang ordered his transfer to house arrest and does not send him to prison. Chen escaped a month later with the help of Song Qingling and other Communists. He moved to the Central Soviet Area and was appointed president of Peng Pai Yang Yin Infantry School. From October 1934 to December 1935, he fought against the Kuomintang army in Guizhou and then in Shanxi, Shaanxi and Gansu in 1936. In February 1937 he was accepted to Counter-Japanese Military and Political University.

When the Second Sino-Japanese War broke out, Chen was appointed commander-in-chief of the 386th Brigade, which he led in victories against the Imperial Japanese army, and his brigade was considered the best in China. In 1940, he led his brigade to Shanxi during Hundred Regiments Offensive. After the surrender of Japan in 1945, Chen's brigade became the 4th Column of the Shanxi-Henan-Hebei-Shandong Military District. He led his troops in important battles of the Chinese Civil War such as the Shangdang Campaign, the Datong-Puzhou Campaign, Linfen–Fushan Campaign and Lüliang Campaign, the Campaign of the eastern foothills of Funiu Mountain, and the Huaihai Campaign. The war ended and the 4th Column became the 4th Army Group, and Chen served as commander and political commissar. His troops entered Yunnan in 1949.

At the request of Chen's longtime friend Hồ Chí Minh, he entered French Indochina to help Võ Nguyên Giáp launch a series of attacks on isolated French bases along the Chinese border in 1950. Back from French Indochina, he left for the Korean War and served as commander and political commissioner of the 3rd Army Group of the People's Volunteer Army. When Commander Peng Dehuai returned to China, Chen temporarily took command. He was awarded the military rank of senior general in September 1955 by Chairman Mao Zedong. His brother-in-law, Tan Zheng, who was married to Chen's sister, Chen Qiuju, was strongly influenced by Chen to join the Communists and became a senior general at the same time.

Returning from the Korean War, Chen founded the PLA Military Engineering Institute in Harbin, engaging in the development of technological weapons. The school became one of the most famous universities in China in a few years. Because of his experience, Chen focused on China's ballistic missile and nuclear weapons program. He died of a heart attack in Shanghai, on March 16, 1961.

Personal life
In 1927 Chen married Wang Genying, who was killed in the Second Sino-Japanese War. She was survived by their son:
 Chen Zhifei, engineer.
In February 1942, he married Fu Ya, the couple had four children, one daughter and three sons, in order of birth:
 Chen Zhijian, military officer.
 Chen Zhijin, doctor and professor, only daughter.
 Chen Zhishu, military officer.
 Chen Zhiya, politician.

Chen Geng was well known as a joker and a prankster amongst comrades. He was a gifted actor and performer and was well known for his acting. This proved instrumental in his underground work. He was jovial and well liked by both Communist comrades as well as former classmates in Whampoa who became Nationalist officers. He had a caring attitude towards comrades and was instrumental in arranging Peng Dehuai's marriage to Pu Anxiu. He was the only Communist Whampoa student to visit his rehabilitated former classmates that had come out of Gongde Lin prison.

References

Bibliography
 
 
 

1903 births
1961 deaths
Whampoa Military Academy alumni
Counter-Japanese Military and Political University alumni
People from Xiangxiang
People's Liberation Army generals from Hunan
People's Republic of China politicians from Hunan
Chinese Communist Party politicians from Hunan
Deputy Ministers of National Defense of the People's Republic of China